Kato Pedina ( meaning "lower fields", before 1928: Κάτω Σουδενά - Kato Soudena) is a village in the Ioannina regional unit in Epirus, Greece. It is in the municipality of Zagori. Its population was counted as 41 in the 2011 census. Kato Pedina is one of the Zagori villages, also known as Zagorochoria, and is in the municipal unit of Central Zagori. It is situated on a mountainside at 940 m elevation, in the northwestern foothills of the Mitsikeli mountains.

History

The village was once called Kato Soudena (as Ano Pedina was called Ano Soudena). The name is of Slavic origin and either means cold ground or "place of meeting". It is possible that the village was formed after the merge of other villages that existed nearby. Most of the Zagori villages have Slavic names that were given to them during the Slavic raids. 

In the location of Gkortzia and Lakkia Spanou, an ancient tomb that dates back to the end of the 2nd millennium BC was discovered.  As a settlement, Kato Pedina was famous during the Byzantine era (the oldest written reference of the name was found in the edict of Andronicus II Palaeologus, in 1321 along with the villages of Papingo, Elafotopos and Ano Pedina), it is one of the oldest villages in Zagori.

The settlement, as all Zagori villages, enjoyed a great growth after the 16th century.

See also

List of settlements in the Ioannina regional unit

External links
Kato Pedina at the GTP Travel Pages

References 

Populated places in Ioannina (regional unit)